The Subaru B11S was a concept sports coupe made by Subaru, introduced at the 2003 Geneva Motor Show.

Design

The model number "B11S" derives from B (for Boxer, referring to Subaru's horizontally-opposed engines), 11 (indicating a premium class), and S (for Sportive). The B11S featured four doors in a quad coupe arrangement, with the rear doors hinged at the rear in a manner similar to the Mazda RX-8 and Saturn Ion.

The B11S was styled by a team led by Kiyoshi Sugimoto, with initial guidance provided by freshly-promoted President Kyoji Takenaka. Sugimoto had previously designed the first-generation Subaru Legacy before heading the Subaru Design Department. Fuore Design International, led by Erwin Leo Himmel, was retained in a consulting design role.

Design elements created for the B11S, including the airplane-inspired grille, were intended to be carried into production vehicles. Andreas Zapatinas, Chief Designer of Advanced Design for Subaru, stated in an interview that "if you were to step back from the B11S and blur your eyes, that gives an indication of Subaru's future look," elaborating that "innovation, courage and individuality" would inform future Subaru designs.

Technical
The 6-speed automatic transmission features Subaru's "Variable Torque Distribution" system, where the torque split between front and rear axles is distributed by a center differential and electronically-controlled clutch. Torque is split 35% to the front and 65% to the rear under normal driving conditions.

References

External links

 

B11S
Sports cars
Coupés
2000s cars
Cars introduced in 1999
Cars introduced in 2003
All-wheel-drive vehicles